The 2011–12 National League 1 is the third season of the third division of the English domestic rugby union competitions since the professionalised format of the second division was introduced. Birmingham & Solihull find themselves playing in this league following their relegation from the 2010-11 RFU Championship in the play-offs, whilst other newcomers to the league in this season are Ealing Trailfinders and Jersey, and Fylde, who won promotion to the league from the 2010–11 National League 2 South and 2010–11 National League 2 North respectively.
 
The league title was contested by two of the newly promoted sides with Jersey finishing the season ahead of rivals Ealing Trailfinders, despite a 5-point deduction.  By winning the league Jersey secured their third promotion in as many seasons, moving up to the 2012–13 RFU Championship.  They were also easily the most popular team in the division with over 33,000 fans attending the 15 home games held at St Peter - a National League 1 record.  At the opposite end of the table, Birmingham & Solihull and Stourbridge were relegated to the 2012–13 National League 2 North while Barking dropped down to the 2012–13 National League 2 South having been league runners up the previous season.

Participating teams and locations

League table

Results

Round 1

Round 2

Round 3

Round 4

Round 5

Round 6

Round 7

Round 8

Round 9

Round 10

Round 11

Round 12

Round 13

Round 14

Round 15

Round 16

Round 17 

Postponed.  Game rescheduled to 17 March 2012.

Round 18

Round 19 

Postponed.  Game rescheduled for 25 February 2012.

Round 20

Round 21

Round 22 

Postponed.  Game rescheduled for 6 April 2012.

Postponed.  Game rescheduled for 25 February 2012.

Postponed.  Game rescheduled for 25 February 2012.

Postponed.  Game rescheduled for 7 April 2012.

Postponed.  Game rescheduled for 25 February 2012.

Postponed.  Game rescheduled for 25 February 2012.

Postponed.  Game rescheduled for 25 February 2012.

Round 23

Rounds 19 & 22 (Rescheduled games) 

Game rescheduled from 11 February 2012.

Game rescheduled from 14 January 2012.

Game rescheduled from 11 February 2012

Game rescheduled from 11 February 2012.

Game rescheduled from 11 February 2012.

Game rescheduled from 11 February 2012.

Round 24

Round 25

Round 17 (Rescheduled game) 

Rescheduled from 17 December 2011.

Round 26

Round 27

Rounds 22 (Rescheduled games) 

Rescheduled from 11 February 2012.

Rescheduled from 11 February 2012.

Round 28

Round 29

Round 30

Total season attendances

Individual statistics 

 Note if players are tied on tries or points the player with the lowest number of appearances will come first.  Also note that points scorers includes tries as well as conversions, penalties and drop goals.

Top points scorers

Top try scorers

Season records

Team
Largest home win — 49 pts
56 - 7 Blaydon at home to Barking on 28 April 2012
Largest away win — 64 pts
64 - 0 Jersey away to Tynedale on 31 March 2012
Most points scored — 64
64 - 0 Jersey away to Tynedale on 31 March 2012
Most tries in a match — 10
Jersey away to Tynedale on 31 March 2012
Most conversions in a match — 8 (x2)
Tynedale at home to Sedgley Park on 10 December 2011
Blaydon at home to Barking on 28 April 2012
Most penalties in a match — 6 (x2)
Cambridge at home to Macclesfield on 1 October 2011
Birmingham & Solihull away to Stourbridge on 14 January 2012
Most drop goals in a match — 2
Wharfedale at home to Jersey on 28 January 2012

Player
Most points in a match — 26
 Michael Le Bourgeois for Jersey at home to Barking on 5 November 2011
Most tries in a match — 5
 Nick Royle for Fylde at home to Cambridge on 25 February 2012
Most conversions in a match — 8 
 Andrew Baggett for Blaydon at home to Barking on 28 April 2012
Most penalties in a match —  6 (x2)
 Tom Wheatcroft for Cambridge at home to Macclesfield on 1 October 2011
 Mark Woodrow for Birmingham & Solihull away to Stourbridge on 14 January 2012
Most drop goals in a match —  2
 Tom Barrett for Wharfedale at home to Jersey on 28 January 2012

Attendances
Highest — 3,648 
Jersey at home to Rosslyn Park on 14 January 2012
Lowest — 101 
Barking at home to Rosslyn Park on 3 September 2011
Highest Average Attendance — 2,206
Jersey
Lowest Average Attendance — 180				
Barking

See also
 English Rugby Union Leagues
 English rugby union system
 Rugby union in England

References

External links
 NCA Rugby

National
National League 1 seasons